
Year 597 (DXCVII) was a common year starting on Tuesday (link will display the full calendar) of the Julian calendar. The denomination 597 for this year has been used since the early medieval period, when the Anno Domini calendar era became the prevalent method in Europe for naming years.

Events 
 By place 

 Byzantine Empire 
 Emperor Maurice writes his last will, in which he describes his ideas for governing the Byzantine Empire (his eldest son, Theodosius, will rule the East from Constantinople, and his second son, Tiberius, the West from Rome).
 Autumn – Balkan Campaign: The Avars, strengthened by the tribute of the Franks, resume their campaign along the Danube River, and besiege the Byzantine fortress city of Tomis (modern Romania) on the Black Sea coast.

 Europe 
 Queen Fredegund defeats her old rival Brunhilda of Austrasia, who supports the claims of her grandsons Theudebert II and Theuderic II to the Frankish throne, against those of Fredegund's son Chlothar II. She dies a few months later at Paris and is buried in the Basilica of Saint Denis.
 Chlothar II, age 13, becomes sole ruler of Neustria, and continues his mother's feud with Brunhilda. He is advised to prepare for war against Austrasia, the eastern part of the Frankish Kingdom.

 Britain 
 Ceolwulf succeeds his brother Ceol as king of Wessex. He becomes regent of Ceol's son Cynegils who is too young to inherit the throne.

 Asia 
 Mangalesha becomes king of the Chalukya Dynasty, after his brother Kirtivarman I dies. He rules as regent of Kirtivarman's son Pulakeshin II, and invades the territory of Khandesh and Gujarat (northwestern India).

 By topic 

 Religion 
 Gregorian Mission: Augustine of Canterbury lands with a group of missionaries on the Isle of Thanet (South East England). He is welcomed by King Æthelberht of Kent, who accepts baptism (along with the rest of his court) at the behest of his Christian Frankish wife, Bertha. Æthelbert assigns Augustine and his 40 monks a residence at Canterbury, where they found a Benedictine monastery that will make the town a centre of Christianity (or 596).
 June 9 – Columba, Irish missionary, dies in Iona (Inner Hebrides) and is buried by his monks in the abbey he has created. He works successfully towards the conversion of northern Britain.
 December 25 – At Christmas, Christianity spreads rapidly in Kent; Augustine and his fellow-labourers baptise more than 10,000 Anglo-Saxons.

 Law 
 England gets her first written code of laws from Æthelbert. The code is concerned with preserving social order, through compensation and punishment for personal injury (approximate date).

 Education 
 The King's School is founded by Augustine in Canterbury. He builds an abbey where the Benedictine teaching takes place.

Births 
 Brahmagupta, Indian mathematician and astronomer (d. 668)
 Chu Suiliang, chancellor of the Tang Dynasty (d. 658)
 Fursey, Irish missionary (approximate date)

Deaths 
 June 9 – Columba, Gaelic Irish missionary (b. 521) 
 Brenainn mac Cairbre, king of Uí Maine (or 601)
 Ceol, king of Wessex (England)
 Fredegund, queen and regent of Neustria
 Kirtivarman I, king of the Chalukya Dynasty (India)
 Zhiyi, de facto founder of Tiantai Buddhism (b. 538)

References